Nate Northup (born Grinnell, Iowa) is an American soccer midfielder who currently coaches for the PVSC Exiles.

College
Northup attended California State University Monterey Bay, playing on the men’s soccer team from 2000 to 2003.  He graduated cum laude in 2004 with a bachelor's degree in teledramatic arts and technology.

Professional
During his collegiate career, Northup also played as an amateur with the Salinas Valley Samba of the fourth division National Premier Soccer League.  Following his graduation from college in 2004, he moved to Europe where he had trials with Tres Cantos Pegaso and Hammarby IF.  In 2006, he returned to the U.S. and signed with the Boulder Rapids Reserve of the PDL.  A year later, he moved to the Wilmington Hammerheads of the USL Second Division.  The Hammerheads released him in 2008.

Coach
Northup was an assistant coach with the California State University, Monterey Bay men's and women's soccer teams.

References

External links
 Wilmington Hammerheads Player Profile
 Cal State Monterey Bay: Nate Northup

1981 births
Living people
American soccer coaches
American soccer players
Colorado Rapids U-23 players
USL League Two players
USL Second Division players
Wilmington Hammerheads FC players
California State University, Monterey Bay alumni
Association football defenders